Pogoni is a municipality in the Ioannina regional unit, Epirus, Greece. The seat of the municipality is the village Kalpaki. The municipality has an area of 701.059 km2. Its population was 8,960 at the 2011 census.

History
Pogoni was populated by the end of the Neolithic Age. Historically, the region was inhabited by the ancient Greek tribe of the Molossians. Along with the rest of Epirus, the area was annexed by the Kingdom of Greece in 1913 after the First Balkan War. Pogoni was also home to the 268th Patriarch of Constantinople, Athenagoras I.

Municipality
The municipality Pogoni was formed at the 2011 local government reform by the merger of the following 6 former municipalities, that became municipal units:
Ano Kalamas
Ano Pogoni
Delvinaki
Kalpaki
Lavdani
Pogoniani

Province
The province of Pogoni was one of the provinces of the Ioannina Prefecture. Its territory corresponded with that of the current municipality Pogoni, except the municipal units Ano Kalamas and Kalpaki. Its seat was the village Delvinaki. It was abolished in 2006.

References

See also 
 Pogoni Municipality (Δήμος Πωγωνίου) (in Greek)

Populated places in Ioannina (regional unit)
Municipalities of Epirus (region)
Provinces of Greece